Studenets is a rural locality (a settlement) in Plosskoye Rural Settlement of Ustyansky District, Arkhangelsk Oblast, Russia. The population was 281 as of 2010. There are 14 streets.

Geography 
Studenets is located on the Ustya River, 69 km northeast of Oktyabrsky (the district's administrative centre) by road. Isakovskaya is the nearest rural locality.

References 

Rural localities in Ustyansky District